Spirit of God may refer to:

Abrahamic religions
 Holy Spirit, a term found in English translations of the Bible, but understood differently among the Abrahamic religions
 Holy Spirit in Judaism, Ruach HaKodesh, the Spirit of YHWH in the Hebrew Bible (Tanakh) and Jewish writings
 Shekhinah, English transliteration of a Hebrew noun
 Holy Spirit in Christianity, the third divine person of the Holy Trinity; each person itself being God
 Seven Spirits of God, term used a few times in the Book of Revelation
 Paraclete (Christianity), means advocate or helper
 Holy Spirit in Islam, Ruh al-Quds, in the Quran, interpreted by some people as the angel Gabriel
 Maid of Heaven, Baha'i Faith, a vision had by founder of the Baha'i Faith of a maiden Messenger of God gave him his mission

Zoroastrianism
 Spenta Mainyu, the most beneficent spirit, the "Holy Spirit"
 Ahura Mazda (Zoroastrianism), a higher spirit of the Old Iranian religion who was proclaimed as the uncreated spirit by Zoroaster

Hinduism
 Brahman (Hinduism), "the unchanging reality amidst and beyond the world", which "cannot be exactly defined"
 Paramatman (Hinduism), the Supreme Soul

Native American religions
 Great Spirit (Indigenous peoples of the Americas), a conception of a supreme being prevalent among some Native American and First Nations cultures
 Gitche Manitou, Algonquian language term for Great Spirit and later for God by Christian missionaries

Chinese
 Qi (Taoism), an active principle forming part of any living thing
 Tian (Confucianism), one of the oldest Chinese terms for the cosmos and a key concept in Chinese mythology, philosophy, and religion

Other
 Naam (Sikhism), the principal method or tool of meditation, which is meant to unite the soul with the Supreme Soul

See also
 Great Spirit (disambiguation)
 Holy Spirit (disambiguation)
 Inner Light (disambiguation)

Holy Spirit